The women's parallel giant slalom competition of the Sochi 2014 Olympics was held at Rosa Khutor Extreme Park on 19 February 2014.

Schedule
All times are (UTC+4).

Results

Qualification
The qualification was started at 09:15.

Elimination round
The 16 best racers advanced to the elimination round.

References

Women's snowboarding at the 2014 Winter Olympics